SB Nation (an abbreviation for their full name SportsBlogs Nation) is a sports blogging network owned by Vox Media. It was co-founded by Tyler Bleszinski, Markos Moulitsas, and Jerome Armstrong in 2005. The blog from which the network formed was started by Bleszinski as Athletics Nation in 2003, and focused solely on the Oakland Athletics. It has since expanded to cover sports franchises on a national scale, including all Major League Baseball, National Basketball Association, National Football League, and National Hockey League teams, as well as college and soccer teams, mixed martial arts and professional wrestling, totaling over 300 community sites. In 2011, the network expanded into technology content with The Verge, leading to the parent company Sports Blogs Inc. being rebranded as Vox Media. SB Nation operates from Vox Media's offices in New York City and Washington, D.C.

Corporate affairs and business model 
From 2005 to 2011, the sports blog network SB Nation (originally known as SportsBlogs Nation) operated under the parent company SportsBlogs Inc., which was headquartered in Washington, D.C. Since Sports Blogs was rebranded as Vox Media, the network has also operated from the digital media company's offices in Manhattan.

Vox Media's chief executive officer, Jim Bankoff, has served as SB Nation CEO since 2009. Elena Bergeron served as editor-in-chief until March 2019.

Many contributors to SB Nation work as part-time contractors, and are paid a stipend each month. The network generates revenue through advertising.

History 
SB Nation was co-founded by friends Tyler Bleszinski and Markos Moulitsas in 2005. The single blog from which the network formed was launched by Bleszinski as Athletics Nation in November 2003, and covered only the Oakland Athletics baseball team. Athletics Nation quickly became Blogads's second largest website, following Daily Kos, where Moulitsas served as an editor. Following the blog network's creation, six additional writers were hired to join Bleszinski in creating content, and Daily Kos' platform was implemented to encourage online community growth. Established bloggers were selected to contribute articles, and sports fans could leave comments. After sites were created for all Major League Baseball (MLB), National Basketball Association (NBA), National Football League (NFL), and National Hockey League (NHL) franchises, along with some college and other teams, Bleszinski focused on company growth and making money.

In 2008, SB Nation raised $5 million in a Series A round of financing with Accel Partners, Allen & Company, and Ted Leonsis contributing. Jim Bankoff, who was advising the company during the venture round, became SB Nation CEO in January 2009. The network had approximately 1 million unique users, and nearly 185 blogs by February. The NHL sanctioned and began linking to SB Nation content on its official website in April, when the network was averaging 5 million unique monthly visitors across nearly 200 sites. In July, Comcast's venture capital branch, Comcast Interactive Capital, spearheaded a nearly $8 million second round of financing. In September 2009, SB Nation was re-launched to serve as a nationally focused portal for the network's blogs. Revenue generated by the network increased by four times in 2009.

In 2010, the network launched 20 regional sites, bringing the total number of sites to nearly 275. SB Nation had 31 full-time employees and was receiving 40 million monthly page views by approximately 8 million unique users, as of mid 2010. Comcast SportsNet and SB Nation agreed to a content sharing partnership in shared markets in June 2010. In November, Khosla Ventures led a third round of funding for SB Nation. The $10.5 million received brought the company's total funding to approximately $23 million. SB Nation acquired the blog networks FanTake and The Offside in March 2011, expanding its coverage of college sports and soccer, respectively. The network hired several Engadget employees to launch its first major expansion outside sports. SB Nation parent company, SportsBlogs Inc., rebranded as Vox Media in October, and The Verge launched in November. In late 2011, MMAFighting.com was integrated into SB Nation after Vox Media acquired the mixed martial arts site from AOL. MMA Fighting produces The MMA Hour and The MMA Beat, which continue to stream on SB Nation and social media outlets, as of 2017.

The redesign was overseen by Spencer Hall, the site's first editorial director. The LGBT sports website Outsports was acquired by Vox Media and integrated into SB Nation in March 2013. The site's founders retained editorial control, and the purchase marked the first time a major sports media company acquired an LGBT-focused website. SB Nation was averaging approximately 50 million unique visitors by mid 2013, and had approximately 800 contributing bloggers by the end of the year.

Elena Bergeron was named SB Nation editor-in-chief in 2017. In mid 2017, the sports and culture website The Ringer transferred its publishing platform from Medium to Vox Media's Chorus platform. The site's founder, Bill Simmons, retained ownership and editorial control. The Ringer parent company, Bill Simmons Media Group, and Vox Media agreed to share revenue generated by advertisements sold by Vox Media. Vox Media began sharing audience traffic between SB Nation and The Ringer. In February 2018, Vox Media laid off 50 employees, including some members of the SB Nation social video team.

In August 2019, after closing its national college football blog Every Day Should Be Saturday (which joined the platform in 2010 after originally being established in 2005 as an independent website), SB Nation announced a new college football vertical known as Banner Society, which will aim to " keep expanding, warping, and sharpening the conversation around college football in all its bizarre, corrupt, colorful elements", and "find new and different ways to connect with our audience directly, all over the internet".

In December 2019, Vox Media announced that in order to comply with California Assembly Bill 5, SB Nation would "end our contracts with most contractors at California brands" over the coming months, and transfer their roles to a new group of employees. The company stated that this would be an extension of investments that have seen more full-time employees working for the network's largest sites, and that former contractors would be able to contribute as unpaid "community insiders".

On April 17, 2020, in response to the 2019-20 coronavirus pandemic, parent company Vox Media announced it would furlough 9% of its workforce starting May 1, 2020, including SB Nation.

Video content  

In May 2016, SB Nation created an online video series for NBC Sports around NBC Sunday Night Football. The network expanded into radio programming in mid-2016 through a partnership with Gow Media. SB Nation sold its first original television program, Foul Play, to Verizon Communications go90, in September. The network was averaging approximately 70 million unique monthly visitors at this time. Foul Play premiered in May 2018.

In January 2018, SB Nation and Eater aired an online three-episode celebrity cooking competition series sponsored by PepsiCo. The show featured National Football League players Greg Jennings, Rashad Jennings, and Nick Mangold as competitors, as well as chefs Anne Burrell and Josh Capon.

SB Nation also maintains a YouTube channel which publishes regular web series by a variety of online hosts and content editors including Jon Bois, Will Buikema, Ryan Simmons, Seth Rosenthal, Kofie Yeboah, Mike Imhoff, Clara Morris and many others. The series produced on the channel include: 
Dorktown, which looks at obscure sports stories 
Chart Party, which does a deep dive on sports statistics
Collapse, about the fall of sports dynasties
The Worst, about the worst sporting events of all time
Rewinder, looking deep at the background and context of key memorable sports moments
Beef History, looking at interpersonal rivalries between athletes and teams
Weird Rules, the odd rules in sports and how they came to be
Fumble Dimension, creating strange scenarios in sports video games
Untitled, about athletes considered great in their sport but never won a title/championship in their playing career
Prism, about athletes who were the opposite of what they were expected to be

In August 2020, SB Nation's YouTube channel was renamed to Secret Base.

Holtzclaw controversy 
In February 2016, the site published a lengthy profile of Daniel Holtzclaw, a former police officer convicted of multiple accounts of rape and other charges, focusing on his college football career. The piece, which was seen as sympathetic to Holtzclaw, was heavily criticized and was taken down within hours of publication. SB Nation editorial director Spencer Hall apologized for "a complete breakdown" of SB Nation editorial process, and described the story and its publication as a "complete failure" of site standards. SB Nation subsequently cut ties with the story's author, freelance journalist Jeff Arnold, and put its longform program on hiatus pending a peer review of the editorial process that led to the Holtzclaw piece being published. The head of the longform program, veteran sportswriter Glenn Stout, was suspended and later fired.

In May 2016, Vox Media published the results of the peer review. It found that the longform program was isolated from the rest of SB Nation in a way that made it impossible for stories to be properly vetted. It also harshly criticized SB Nation for not giving individual editors the authority to review stories about sensitive topics. At the time, sensitive stories were reviewed by the newsroom's two most senior women, senior editor Elena Bergeron and senior content producer Sarah Kogod. The reviewers found that this practice made it appear that an individual editor did not have the responsibility to "care to the fullest extent about matters of ethics, integrity, and accuracy." It also raised concerns about the lack of diversity in the newsroom. Based on the review, SB Nation permanently shelved the longform program, replacing it with a features program. SB Nation also announced it would take steps to diversify its newsroom. In a statement, SB Nation said that the Holtzclaw situation revealed that "an organization cannot afford to wait to be diverse, particularly if that organization is one that wants to tell stories."

Recognition 
In 2011, Time included SB Nation in their list of "50 Websites That Make the Web Great". SB Nation was a finalist in the seventh annual Shorty Awards "fansite" category (2015), and received a National Magazine Award (or Ellie Award) in the "Digital Innovation" category in 2018 as the publisher of Jon Bois narrative, 17776. A sequel to 17776, 20020, was released in September–October 2020, with a third edition, 20021, was set to be released in 2021, but as of 2022 has no set date of release.

Letterboxd named Jon Bois' and Alex Rubenstein's collaborative documentary on the history of the Seattle Mariners the highest rated documentary miniseries of 2020, and The New York Times listed its first episode, "This is not an endorsement of arson," as one of the best episodes of TV of 2020.

References

External links 

 

 
Internet properties established in 2005
American sport websites
Vox Media